Osentsy is a rural locality (a village) in Gamovskoye Rural Settlement, Permsky District, Perm Krai, Russia. The population was 137 as of 2010. There are 2 streets.

Geography 
Osentsy is located on the Chechera River, 19 km southwest of Perm (the district's administrative centre) by road. Yermashi is the nearest rural locality.

References 

Rural localities in Permsky District